Aloguinsan, officially the Municipality of Aloguinsan,  is a 4th class municipality in the province of Cebu, Philippines. According to the 2020 census, it has a population of 34,466 people.

History

Aloguinsan was formerly a barrio of Pinamungajan. It was created a town by the Royal Decree of the Kingdom of Spain in 1886.

Bulwarte, a historic landmark, still stands as mute testimony to the courage of the early inhabitants of Aloguinsan. Because of the frequent Moro attacks, the natives, under the supervision of the Spaniards, constructed a watchtower on top of a hill at the mouth of a river. From this vantage point, they could see incoming Moro vintas.

One night (a full moon and favorable winds), the Muslim invaders approached the village. With old people, women, and children safe behind the hills, the men began firing their cannons and did not stop until the pirates had been annihilated. It was the end of Moro assaults.

The historic hill of Villona between the barrios of Olango and Cawasan was also the site of a battle between the American forces and Filipino revolutionaries. The rebels under the leadership of Anastacio de la Cruz encountered the forces of Lt. Walker on Holy Thursday, April 1903. Lt. Walker and a number of his men were killed. The following day, Good Friday, Lt. McCoy took over the command of the American troops and outfought the Pulahanes (the rebels were so called because of their red headbands) who were defeated.

The courage and patriotism of the Aloguinsan were again tested in World War II. Cebuano guerillas resisted Japanese invaders, and joined Allied and Filipino troops of the 3rd, 8th, 82nd and 83rd Infantry Division of the Philippine Commonwealth Army.

Geography
Aloguinsan is bordered to the north by the town of Pinamungajan, to the west is the Tañon Strait, to the east is the city of Carcar, and to the south is the town of Barili.

Barangays
Aloguinsan comprises 15 barangays:

Climate

Demographics

Festival

Every June, they celebrate the famous "Kinsan Festival", named after the Dotted Grouper (Epinephelus epistictus), known locally as Kinsan, that is usually abundant in months of May to July. The town fiesta is celebrated every 2nd Sunday of June. Interestingly, the saint is sometimes depicted in religious iconography as holding a fish.

Only Aloguinsan has a titular parish of Saint Raphael the Archangel in the entire Metropolitan Archdiocese of the Most Holy Name of Jesus.

Tourism

 Bojo River 
 Hermit's Cove
 Hidden Beach

Notable personalities

 Jojo Tangkay -  A professional basketball player notably played in PBL then PBA's Welcoat Dragons.

References

Sources

External links

 [ Philippine Standard Geographic Code]

Municipalities of Cebu